František Kratochvíl (16 January 1904 – 30 November 1995) was a Czech wrestler. He competed at the 1924 and the 1928 Summer Olympics.

References

External links
 

1904 births
1995 deaths
Olympic wrestlers of Czechoslovakia
Wrestlers at the 1924 Summer Olympics
Wrestlers at the 1928 Summer Olympics
Czech male sport wrestlers
People from Kolín District
Sportspeople from the Central Bohemian Region